Christmas seals are labels placed on mail during the Christmas season to raise funds and awareness for charitable programs. They have become particularly associated with lung diseases such as tuberculosis, and with child welfare. Christmas seals are regarded as a form of cinderella stamp in contrast with Christmas stamps used for postage.

Origins 

At the beginning of the 1900s tuberculosis was a greatly feared disease, and its harmful effects on children seemed particularly devastating.
In 1904, Einar Holbøll, a Danish postal clerk, developed the idea of adding an extra charitable stamp on mailed holiday greetings during Christmas. The money raised could be used to help children sick with tuberculosis. The plan was approved by the Postmaster and the King of Denmark (Christian IX).

In 1904, the world's first Christmas seal was issued, bearing the likeness of the Danish Queen (Louise of Hesse-Kassel) and the word Julen (Christmas).  Over 4 million were sold in the first year at DKK 0.02 per seal.

During the first six years, enough funds were raised to build the Christmas Seal Sanatorium in Kolding, which was opened in 1911.
The same year the sanatorium was transferred to the administration of the Danish National Association to Combat Tuberculosis as it was considered a waste of resources to have two organisations working towards the same purpose.
The Danish Christmas Seal Committee – today known as Julemærkefonden (the Christmas Seal Fund) - decided at that time to put all future collected funds to use in building and operating convalescent homes for children.

In Europe 
Soon after Denmark issued the first Christmas seal, Sweden and Iceland followed. Seals then spread throughout Scandinavia and every major country in Europe, and are still popular today. Christmas seals have been issued by hundreds of different societies, nationally, and locally in Asia, Africa, North and South America, and Australia. The majority of all TB seals since then were issued at Christmas time and included the international symbol against TB, the double barred Cross of Lorraine.

In the United States 

They were introduced to the United States by Emily Bissell in 1907, after she had read about the 1904 Danish Christmas seal in an article by Danish-born Jacob Riis, a muckraking journalist and photographer. Bissell hoped to raise money for a sanitarium on the Brandywine Creek in Delaware. Bissell went on to design a Delaware local Christmas seal in 1908. Local Christmas seals have existed alongside national issues in the US since 1907, and are catalogued by the Christmas Seal & Charity Stamp Society.

By 1908, Bissell's idea grew to a national program administered by the National Association for the Study and Prevention of Tuberculosis (NASPT) and the American National Red Cross. The seals were sold in post office lobbies, initially in Delaware at US$0.1 each. Net proceeds from the sales would be divided equally between the two organizations.  By 1920, the Red Cross withdrew from the arrangement and sales were conducted exclusively by the NASPT, then known as the National Tuberculosis Association (NTA). Various promotional schemes were tried: in 1954 the small town of Saranac Lake, New York (home of the Adirondack Cottage Sanitarium) won a nationwide competition selling Christmas seals, the reward for which was hosting the world premiere of the Paul Newman film The Silver Chalice; the cast participated in a parade in the town's annual winter carnival.

After World War II with the development of the antibiotic streptomycin TB became a curable disease, although it would be decades before it could be considered under control in developed countries. To reflect the expanding scope of the organization's goals, the name was changed to the National Tuberculosis and Respiratory Disease Association in the late 1960s.  The NTRDA became the American Lung Association in 1973, though the 1974 seals continue to show the NTRDA inscription on the sheet margin.

The Christmas song, Mistletoe and Holly (1957) was selected as the theme song for the 1960 Christmas Seals appeal.

Today the Christmas seals benefit the American Lung Association and other lung related issues.  Tuberculosis was declining, but recently has been on the rise.  TB is still one of the most common major infectious diseases in the world.

In 1987 the American Lung Association acquired a trademark for the term "Christmas Seals" to protect their right to be the sole US national fundraising Association to issue them. Of course, this trademark would not apply to Christmas seals issued outside the US or local and regional Christmas seals, used in the US by many organizations since 1907 when the Kensington Dispensary in Philadelphia, Pennsylvania, issued their own local Christmas seal.

In Canada 
By 1908, the campaign had reached Canada. Interested people in Toronto and Hamilton, Ontario began Christmas seal campaigns to build and support sanatoria, as TB hospitals were then called.

The Toronto Globe came promptly to their aid. Early in December, the Globe began running a daily story on the front page giving news of the campaign. The column was bordered by holly so that readers could easily spot it.

One story told how the children of 58 Toronto schools had sold 10,000 Christmas seals. Another issue announced that out in Regina, Saskatchewan another paper, the Regina Leader, had written to say its staff would sell the seals and send the money back for the sanatorium being built in Muskoka.

From Saint John, New Brunswick, the Rev. G. A. Moore wrote to say that he and other volunteers would sell 8,500 and send the money to Toronto for the sanatorium.

That first year, the Toronto campaign brought in $6,114.25 and Hamilton citizens gave $1,244.40.
Year by year, other cities across Canada tried the Christmas seal campaign as a means not only of raising money but of creating the awareness that tuberculosis could be controlled.

Finally, in 1927, it was agreed that the Christmas seal campaign was to be the official method for tuberculosis associations to appeal to the public for funds. A national seal was established.

Christmas seal campaigns have played an important role in public health. At first, the money raised was used for the new and badly needed sanatoria. When these were established, Christmas seal funds were used for TB prevention. The seals have paid for millions of Canadians to have chest X-ray or tuberculin tests. As a result, thousands of TB cases were discovered before disease spread to others.

The Canadian Lung Association's Christmas seals continue to symbolize the grassroots support of Canadians that helped win the fight against TB.

Other countries 
There are nearly one hundred different lung associations worldwide that issue Christmas seals. Many different countries issue their own Christmas seals, as well as cities, states and territories. Green's Catalog, the bible of US and worldwide TB Christmas seal collecting would distinguish them as national versus local Christmas seals. Many tuberculosis seal issuing societies are members of the International Union against Tuberculosis and Lung Disease, which holds a Christmas seal contest for best design among their Organizational and Constituent seal issuing members at their annual World Conference on Lung Health.

Unrecognised seals
Between 1937 and 1943 the Danish Nazi Party (DNSAP) issued a variety of seals featuring the Nazi swastika. These scarce seals contain Christmas themes like holly, but no known connection to the fight against tuberculosis, and for this reason, they are not listed in Green's Catalog.

History has shown that most dictatorial regimes suspend Christmas seals from being issued. This happened in Korea under the Japanese occupation, China under the communists, and Argentina under Eva Peron.

Many other charitable funds were issued at Christmas time, often with Christmas themes, by religious organizations, civic and fraternal societies, patriotic organizations, sororities, etc., but since they were not issued to fight tuberculosis, they lack the double barred cross of Lorraine, the international symbol for the fight against tuberculosis, proposed in 1902 at the International Conference on Tuberculosis in Berlin Germany, and strictly speaking do not qualify as Christmas seals.

See also 

 MV Christmas Seal
The Christmas Seal & Charity Stamp Society
Easter Seals A charitable organization for helping handicapped children.
Easter seals (philately) Easter seals in stamp collecting.

References

External links 

The Christmas Seal and Charity Stamp Society A non profit organization founded in 1931, publishing catalogs of worldwide fund raising seals including Christmas and Easter seals, as well as a quarterly journal, Seal News.
The Cinderella Stamp Club
Danish Christmas seals from 1904 onwards
Annual Christmas Seal Contest at World Conference on Lung Health, the convention of the International Union against TB & Lung Disease

Seal
Philatelic terminology
Cinderella stamps
Danish inventions
American Lung Association